The Athlete Institute is an athletic centre located in Mono, Ontario. It is made up of two facilities, the training centre and the fieldhouse. The institute is home to The Orangeville Prep Basketball Academy,  who compete in the Ontario Scholastic Basketball Association (OSBA). Orangeville District Secondary School provides academic instruction for the institute's students. It was formerly home to the Orangeville A's of the National Basketball League of Canada (NBL). Athlete Institute is currently sponsored by Nike and BioSteel.

History 
The institute was founded in September 2010 by colleagues Jesse Tipping and Adam Hoffman. Tipping followed the dreams of his father, James, who wanted to create the best basketball facility in Canada. Tipping would later compete with the Brampton A's, an NBL Canada team owned by his family, which had grown rich through the trucking industry. The A's relocated to Orangeville and claimed the Athlete Institute as their home arena.

The Athlete Institute has received praise from several players, including local high school basketball player Jalen Poyser, who said, "I thought it was like an NBA facility when I got here." The Toronto Star credited the institute for attracting top talent from around the world. The newspaper also considered Tipping as one of the "five most important people in Canadian basketball."

In September 2014, the institute received significant exposure when highly touted 2016 NBA draft prospect Thon Maker joined the program; he went on to become the first high schooler to be taken in the first round of an NBA draft since 2005.

Orangeville Prep 
Orangeville Prep is the national team at Athlete Institute. They compete in The Grind Session in addition as the Ontario Scholastic Basketball Association (OSBA). In the 2019-20 OSBA season, Orangeville Prep won the championship, and had a 19–0 record in the regular season.

The team and the school are the subject of the 2021 CBC Television documentary series Anyone's Game.

Notable alumni 
 Jamal Murray, professional basketball player for the Denver Nuggets
 Thon Maker, professional basketball player for the Fujian Sturgeons
 Luguentz Dort, professional basketball player for the Oklahoma City Thunder
 Ignas Brazdeikis, professional basketball player for BC Žalgiris
 Oshae Brissett, professional basketball player for the Indiana Pacers
 Kyle Alexander, professional basketball player for Valencia Basket
 Matur Maker, professional basketball player who last played for the Canterbury Rams

References

External links 
 

National Basketball League of Canada arenas
Basketball venues in Ontario
Orangeville A's